The Johns Hopkins Bloomberg School of Public Health is the public health graduate school of Johns Hopkins University, a private research university in Baltimore, Maryland. As the second independent, degree-granting institution for research in epidemiology and training in public health, and the largest public health training facility in the United States, the school is ranked first in public health in the U.S. News & World Report rankings and has held that ranking since 1994. The school is ranked second for public health in the world by EduRank and Shanghai Rankings, behind the Harvard T.H. Chan School of Public Health.

History
Originally named the Johns Hopkins School of Hygiene and Public Health, the school was founded in 1916 by William H. Welch with a grant from the Rockefeller Foundation, the second school of public health in the U.S. after Tulane University. The school was renamed the Johns Hopkins Bloomberg School of Public Health on April 20, 2001, in honor of Michael Bloomberg (founder of the eponymous media company) for his financial support and commitment to the school and Johns Hopkins University. Bloomberg has donated a total of $2.9 billion to Johns Hopkins University over a period of several decades.

The school is also the founder of Delta Omega (est. 1924), the national honorary society for graduate training in public health. The Bloomberg School is fully accredited by the Council on Education for Public Health (CEPH).

Origins
In 1913, the Rockefeller Foundation sponsored a conference on the need for public health education in the United States. Foundation officials were convinced that a new profession of public health was needed. It would be allied to medicine but also distinct, with its own identity and educational institutions. The result of deliberations between public health leaders and foundation officials was the Welch–Rose Report of 1915, which laid out the need for adequately trained public health workers, and envisioned an "institute of hygiene" for the United States. The report reflected the different preferences of the plan's two architects—William Henry Welch favored scientific research, whereas Wickliffe Rose wanted an emphasis on public health practice.

In June 1916, the executive committee of the Rockefeller Foundation approved the plan to organize an institute or school of public health at Johns Hopkins University in Baltimore, Maryland, United States. The institute was named the School of Hygiene and Public Health, indicating a compromise between those who wanted the practical public health training on the British model and those who favored basic scientific research on the German model. Welch, the first dean of the Johns Hopkins School of Medicine, also became the founding dean of the first school of public health in the United States.

The facility is located on the former Maryland Hospital site founded in 1797. The Maryland Hospital was originally built as a hospital to care for Yellow Fever for the indigent away from the city. In 1840, the hospital expanded to exclusively care for the mentally ill. In 1873, the buildings were torn down as the facility relocated to a new site as the Spring Grove Hospital Center.

Legacy
The Johns Hopkins School of Public Health represents the archetype for formalized public health training and epidemiology education in the United States. By 1922, other schools of public health at Harvard, Columbia and Yale had all been established in accordance with the Hopkins model. The Rockefeller Foundation continued to sponsor the creation of public health schools in the United States and around the world in the 1920s and 1930s, extending the American model of the Johns Hopkins School of Public Health to countries such as Brazil, Bulgaria, Canada, Czechoslovakia, England, Hungary, India, Italy, Japan, Norway, the Philippines, Poland, Rumania, Sweden, Turkey, and Yugoslavia.

Leaders
The official title of the head of the school has changed periodically between director and dean throughout the years. Originally the title was director. In 1931, it was changed to dean and in 1946 back to director. In 1958, the title again became dean. The directors and deans of the Bloomberg School include:

 William H. Welch (1916–1927)
 William Henry Howell (1927–1931)
 Wade Hampton Frost (1931–1934)
 Allen W. Freeman (1934–1937)
 Lowell Reed (1937–1947)
 Ernest L. Stebbins (1947–1967)
 John C. Hume (1967–1977)
 Donald A. Henderson (1977–1990)
 Alfred Sommer (1990–2005)
 Michael J. Klag (2005–2017)
 Ellen J. MacKenzie (2017–present)

Reputation and ranking
The Bloomberg School is the largest school of public health in the world, with 875 primary and 833 affiliated faculty, and 3,639 students from 97 countries. It is home to over 80 research centers and institutes with research ongoing in the U.S. and more than 60 countries worldwide. The school ranks first in federal research support from the National Institutes of Health (NIH), receives nearly 25 percent of all funds distributed among the 40 U.S. schools of public health, and has consistently been ranked first among schools of public health by U.S. News & World Report. The school is ranked second for public health in the world by EduRank and Shanghai Rankings, behind the Harvard T.H. Chan School of Public Health.

Academic degrees and departments
The school offers master's degrees, doctoral degrees, postdoctoral training, and residency programs in general preventive medicine and occupational medicine. and combined and certificate training programs in various areas of public health. It is composed of 10 academic departments:
 Biochemistry and Molecular Biology
 Biostatistics
 Environmental Health and Engineering
 Epidemiology: has the largest overall postdoctoral training program in the School of Public Health. Many postdoctoral fellows and predoctoral trainees (master's level and doctoral level degree students) are supported by NIH-funded training programs. Affiliated centers and institutes include George W. Comstock Center for Public Health Research and Prevention and the Wendy Klag Center for Autism and Developmental Disabilities.
 Health, Behavior and Society
 Health Policy and Management
 International Health
 Mental Health
 Molecular Microbiology and Immunology
 Population, Family and Reproductive Health

Location
The Bloomberg School of Public Health is located in the East Baltimore campus of the Johns Hopkins University. The campus, collectively known as the Johns Hopkins Medical Institutions (JHMI), is also home to the School of Medicine and the School of Nursing and comprises several city blocks, radiating outwards from the Billings Building of the Johns Hopkins Hospital with its historic dome. The main building on which the school is located is on North Wolfe Street; it has nine floors and features an observation area and a fitness center on the top floor. The Bloomberg School also occupies Hampton House on North Broadway. The school is also serviced by the Welch Medical Library, a central resource shared by all the schools of the Medical Campus. The campus includes the Lowell Reed Residence Hall and the Denton Cooley Recreational Center. Public transportation to and from the campus is served by the Baltimore Metro Subway, local buses, and the JHMI shuttle.

Notable alumni
Some of the graduates of the Bloomberg School of Public Health include:
 Lolade Adeyemi, Nigerian medical doctor
 Miriam Alexander: President of the American College of Preventive Medicine
 Virginia Apgar: Apgar test, Anesthesiology, Teratology, founder of the field of Neonatology
 Anna Baetjer: Physiologist known for her work on the carcinogenic effects of Chromium
 Abdullah Baqui: public health scientist
 Leroy Edgar Burney: 8th Surgeon General of the United States, first to publicly identify cigarette smoke as a cause of lung cancer
 Dr. Chen Chien-jen – Vice President of Taiwan (2016–); former Minister of Health, VP and Academician of national academic institute (Academia Sinica)
 António Correia de Campos: Member of the European Parliament since 2009; Health Minister of Portugal 2001–2002, 2005–2008
 George W. Comstock: Epidemiologist, Pioneer of tuberculosis control and treatment
 Deborah J. Cotton: Emerita Professor of Medicine at the Boston University School of Medicine
 Dorland J. Davis: 3rd  Director of the National Institute of Allergy and Infectious Diseases
 Donna M. Felling: Baltimore County nurse and member of the Maryland House of Delegates
 Sanjay Ghose: Indian rural development activist who pioneered rural community health and development media initiatives
 Donald A. Henderson: Eradication of smallpox, Presidential Medal of Freedom, former Dean 1977–1990
 Alexander Langmuir: Epidemiologist, founder of the Epidemic Intelligence Service
 Hugo López-Gatell: Deputy Secretary of Prevention and Health Promotion of Mexico
 Suzanne Maman: HIV/AIDS researcher
 Antonia Novello: 14th Surgeon General of the United States
 Peter Pronovost: Intensive care checklist protocol, Time 100 (2008), MacArthur Fellow
 Martha E. Rogers: Major figure in Nursing theory, created the Science of Unitary Human Beings
 Bernard Roizman: Virologist, world's foremost expert on the Herpes Simplex Virus
 Linda Rosenstock: Dean of the University of California, Los Angeles School of Public Health
 Dorry Segev, Israeli-born Marjory K. and Thomas Pozefsky Professor of Surgery at Johns Hopkins University School of Medicine, Professor of Epidemiology at Johns Hopkins Bloomberg School of Public Health, and Associate Vice Chair of the Department of Surgery at Johns Hopkins Hospital
 Richard David Semba, W. Richard Green Professor of Ophthalmology at the Johns Hopkins School of Medicine
 Susan G. Sherman, epidemiologist and Bloomberg Professor of American Health in the Department of Health, Behavior and Society at Johns Hopkins University.
 Alfred Sommer: Nutrition, Discovered efficacy of Vitamin A in reducing child mortality, former Dean 1990–2005
 Paul B. Spiegel: Humanitarian health leader
 Andrew Spielman: Major figure in the modern history of public health entomology & vector-borne diseases
 John Travis: Pioneer in the Wellness movement
 Miriam Were: African health advocate, recipient of the Légion d'honneur & the Hideyo Noguchi Africa Prize

Publications 
 American Journal of Epidemiology
 Epidemiologic Reviews
 Progress in Community Health Partnerships: Research, Education, and Action (PCHP)
 Journal of Health Care for the Poor and Underserved
 Hopkins Bloomberg Public Health Magazine

References

Bibliography

External links
Official website

 
Johns Hopkins Medical Institutions
Middle East, Baltimore
Educational institutions established in 1916
Academic health science centres
1916 establishments in Maryland
Schools of public health in the United States